The 1832 United States presidential election in Louisiana took place between November 2 and December 5, 1832, as part of the 1832 United States presidential election. Voters chose five representatives, or electors to the Electoral College, who voted for President and Vice President.

Louisiana voted for the Democratic Party candidate, Andrew Jackson, over the National Republican candidate, Henry Clay. Jackson won Louisiana by a margin of 23.34%.

Results

See also
 United States presidential elections in Louisiana

References

Louisiana
1832
1832 Louisiana elections